Hyttbakken is a village in the municipality of Selbu in Trøndelag county, Norway.

References

Villages in Trøndelag
Selbu